General Perrin may refer to:

Abner Monroe Perrin (1827–1864), Confederate States Army brigadier general 
Herbert T. Perrin (1893–1962), U.S. Army brigadier general
Joseph Perrin (1754–1800), French general of the Revolutionary Wars

See also
Louis François Perrin de Précy (1742–1820), French Army lieutenant general